Markus Juva (born 4 June 1975 in Helsinki, Finland) is a professional Finnish pool player. At the 2007 World Cup of Pool, Juva and partner Mika Immonen reached the final, only to lose 11–10., and competed in the event on four other occasions. Juva is a several time Finnish pool champion, first winning the Finnish 8-Ball national championships in 1994.

In 2005, Juva won his only Euro Tour event, winning the Austrian Open, defeating Tony Drago in the final.

Titles
 1994 Finnish Pool Championship 8-Ball
 2005 Euro Tour Austrian Open

References

External links

Finnish pool players
1975 births
Living people
Sportspeople from Helsinki